The Rt. Rev. Vedanayagam Devasahayam was an Indian bishop in the late 20th and early 21st centuries. He was the Bishop of Madras from 1999 to 2014.

Notes

 

 

21st-century Anglican bishops in India
20th-century Anglican bishops in India
Indian bishops
Indian Christian religious leaders
Anglican bishops of Madras